Eric Vernan (born 4 July 1987) is a Jamaican international footballer who plays for Harbour View, as a right winger.

Career
Vernan has played club football in Jamaica and Norway for Portmore United, Nybergsund IL and Harbour View.

He made his international debut for Jamaica on 26 July 2008, in a friendly match against El Salvador.

References

1987 births
Living people
Jamaican footballers
Jamaica international footballers
Portmore United F.C. players
Nybergsund IL players
Norwegian First Division players
2009 CONCACAF Gold Cup players
2011 CONCACAF Gold Cup players
Pan American Games competitors for Jamaica
Jamaican expatriate footballers
Jamaican expatriate sportspeople in Norway
Expatriate footballers in Norway
Harbour View F.C. players
Association football wingers
National Premier League players
People from Clarendon Parish, Jamaica
Pan American Games silver medalists for Jamaica
Pan American Games medalists in football
Medalists at the 2007 Pan American Games
Footballers at the 2007 Pan American Games